Andrée Lachapelle,  (November 13, 1931 – November 21, 2019) was a French Canadian actress.  Born in Montreal, she trained at age 14 at the Studio XV theatre school under Gerard Vleminckx, later attended teacher's college and taught elementary school for a few years.  In 1952 she met actor Robert Gadouas, performed with him, and had three children before his death in 1969.  She later appeared in plays by Michel Tremblay, Samuel Beckett and Tennessee Williams and in the films Rope Around the Neck (La corde au cou), YUL 871, Laura Laur, Léolo, Cap Tourmente, Route 132, The Last Escape and Don't Let the Angels Fall.

In 1985, Andrée Lachapelle was made an Officer of the Order of Canada. In 1997, she was made a Knight of the National Order of Quebec.

On November 21, 2019, Lachapelle died via assisted suicide at the age of 88 following a battle with cancer. She posthumously won the Prix Iris for Best Actress at the 22nd Quebec Cinema Awards, for her final performance in the film And the Birds Rained Down (Il pleuvait des oiseaux).

Bibliography 
 Marcel Dubé, Andrée Lachapelle : entre ciel et terre, collection Portraits d'artistes, Mnémosyne, Montréal, 1995, 117 p.,

Notes and references

External links
 
 Celebrating Women's Achievements. Andrée Lachapelle (1931– ) Actor., Library and Archives Canada biography

1931 births
2019 deaths
20th-century Canadian actresses
21st-century Canadian actresses
Actresses from Montreal
Canadian film actresses
Place of death missing
Canadian stage actresses
Canadian television actresses
Deaths by euthanasia
French Quebecers
Knights of the National Order of Quebec
Officers of the Order of Canada
Suicides in Canada
Best Actress Jutra and Iris Award winners